A Goguette was a singing society in France and Belgium, and its members were called goguettiers. As well as providing venues for informal solo and ensemble singing, goguettes also served as places for drinking, socialising, and recreation.

Goguettes can trace their history back to 1729 and the "Société du Caveau" in Paris, founded by poet and chansonnier Pierre Gallet (1698–1757), but their heyday was in the years 1818–1900. They can still be found today.

In the early 19th century, goguettes met in the premises of cafés and restaurants, and provide a space for their members (for a small fee) to sing in public or to have their own compositions sung. Songs would explore well-worn epicurean themes such as drinking and eating, though political and social songs also played an important part. Open to all social ranks, in practice they tended to attract literate men from the artisan class; they were also associated with revolutionary politics and were carefully monitored by the authorities.

A goguette was a place for drinking, singing (both solo and ensemble) and socialising. It tended to draw its members from the locality, and would have a formal structure of committee meetings, officials, minutes etc., as well as social events. Membership was usually open to all – men, women and children, of any social class. Some tended to attract certain types like artists or intellectuals, such as the "Gnoufs-Gnoufs", "Poulet sauté" or "Frileux" in Paris. Apart from the capital, goguettes could be found in many French provincial towns and cities (Bordeaux, Marseille, Rouen, Toulouse, etc.) as well as in rural areas.

See also 
Eugène Imbert
Guinguette
Café-chantant

References

This article is based on translated text from the French Wikipedia article Goguette.

French music history
Clubs and societies in France
1729 establishments in Europe